The 1988–89 Rugby League Divisional Premiership  was the 3rd end-of-season Rugby League Divisional Premiership competition.

The competition was contested by the top eight teams in the second Division. The winners were Sheffield Eagles.

First round

Replay

Semi-finals

Final

See also
 1988–89 Rugby Football League season

Notes

References
 

Rugby League Divisional Premiership